"Wild One", originally titled "She's a Wild One", is a country music song written by Pat Bunch, Jaime Kyle, and Will Rambeaux. It was first recorded in 1992 by country band Zaca Creek on their album, Broken Heartland, and country band Evangeline on their 1993 album, French Quarter Moon. Faith Hill later covered the song on her 1993 debut album, Take Me as I Am, and released it in late 1993 as her debut single. Hill's rendition was also her first Number One, spending the first four chart weeks of 1994 at the top of the Billboard Hot Country Singles & Tracks chart.

American Aquarium covered the song on their 2021 album Slappers, Bangers, and Certified Twangers: Vol 1.

Track listing
CD single
"Wild One" - 2:45
"Go the Distance" - 3:02
"I Would Be Stronger Than That" - 4:48

Chart positions

Year-end charts

References

1993 debut singles
1992 songs
Faith Hill songs
Songs written by Pat Bunch
Songs written by Will Rambeaux
Warner Records Nashville singles